Oda Mahaut (16 October 1887 – 19 May 1955) was a French fencer. She competed in the women's individual foil event at the 1928 Summer Olympics.

References

External links
 

1887 births
1955 deaths
French female foil fencers
Olympic fencers of France
Fencers at the 1928 Summer Olympics